Rosmarie Honegger (born 1947) is a Swiss lichenologist and Emeritus Professor at the University of Zurich.

Academic career 
Honegger was born in 1947 and grew up in Emmental, Switzerland. She graduated with a PhD in biology from the University of Basel in 1976. In 1977 she accepted a postdoctoral research position in the Institute of Plant Biology at the University of Zurich. After a time working at the University of California, Riverside she returned to Switzerland as professor in the Institute of Plant Biology of the University of Zurich. Honegger retired in 2009 as Emeritus Professor. From 2011 she worked with Dianne Edwards, a palaeobotanist at the Cardiff University on lichen fossils found on the Welsh borderland.

Honegger was awarded the International Association for Lichenology's Acharius Medal for her lifetime work in lichenology in 2008 and in 2015 she received the Linnean Medal recognising her contribution to the natural sciences.

Among the lichens named in her honour is Xanthomendoza rosmarieae, described in 2011 by Sergei Yakovlevich Kondratyuk and Ingvar Kärnefelt.

Selected publications

References 

1947 births
Living people
University of Basel alumni
Academic staff of the University of Zurich
University of California, Riverside faculty
Swiss lichenologists
Acharius Medal recipients
Linnean Medallists
Women lichenologists